Posoqueria is a genus of flowering plants in the family Rubiaceae. The genus is found Mexico to tropical America.

Species

Posoqueria acutifolia Mart.
Posoqueria bahiensis Macias & L.S.Kinosh.
Posoqueria calantha Barb.Rodr.
Posoqueria chocoana C.M.Taylor
Posoqueria coriacea M.Martens & Galeotti
Posoqueria correana C.M.Taylor
Posoqueria costaricensis C.M.Taylor
Posoqueria fragrantissima Linden & André
Posoqueria grandiflora Standl.
Posoqueria grandifructa Hammel & C.M.Taylor
Posoqueria laevis C.M.Taylor
Posoqueria latifolia (Rudge) Schult.
Posoqueria laurifolia Mart.
Posoqueria longifilamentosa C.M.Taylor
Posoqueria longiflora Aubl.
Posoqueria palustris Mart.
Posoqueria platysiphonia Rusby
Posoqueria robusta Hammel & C.M.Taylor
Posoqueria tarairensis C.M.Taylor
Posoqueria trinitatis DC.
Posoqueria velutina Standl.
Posoqueria williamsii Steyerm.

Image gallery

References

Rubiaceae genera
Posoquerieae